Redwall Friend & Foe was published in 2000 as an accessory to the Redwall series by Brian Jacques.

Summary
This guide features art by Chris Baker and contains descriptions of Redwall heroes and villains. It also features a pull-out poster and a number of questions to test the reader's knowledge of the series.

Heroes
The heroes featured in the guide are:
Martin the Warrior
Luke the Warrior
Sunflash the Mace
Mariel Gullwhacker
Joseph the Bellmaker
Urthstripe the Strong
Matthias
Mattimeo
Grath Longfletch
Tamello De Fformelo Tussock (Tammo)
Dannflor Reguba

Villains
The villains featured in the guide are:
Badrang the Tyrant
Tsarmina Greeneyes
Vilu Daskar
Swartt Sixclaw
Gabool the Wild
Urgan Nagru
Ferahgo the Assassin
Cluny the Scourge
Slagar the Cruel
Ublaz Mad-Eyes
Damug Warfang
Mokkan

References 

Redwall books
2000 children's books